Arcaffe is a chain of cafes in Israel with 29 outlets across the country. The chain was established in 1995 with the aim of bringing Italian espresso bars to Israel. Arcaffe launched its international activity by signing a cooperation agreement with Galeries Lafayette, a mall in Paris. Arcaffe now operates two branches in France. Arcaffe, which has upscale pretensions, chooses its locations carefully, preferring affluent neighborhoods and high-tech centers.

See also

 List of coffeehouse chains

References

Coffeehouses and cafés in Israel
Israeli brands
Italian restaurants